The volleyball tournament for the 1994 Goodwill Games was held from July 21 to 27, 1994 in Saint Petersburg, Russia.

Participating teams

Rosters

Medalists

References

1994 Goodwill Games
1994 in volleyball
International volleyball competitions hosted by Russia
Volleyball at the Goodwill Games